Algo Natural is the eighth studio album recorded by Mexican singer Alejandra Guzmán, and it was released on September 14, 1999.

Album information
The album was her second produced by Oscar Lopez (tracks 1 to 7) and the first by Juan Carlos Calderón (tracks 9 to 14), and both co-produced the track "Paloma Herida". It is the first album by the singer to include more than eleven tracks (and to date the only) with fourteen. This was the only time that Guzmán worked with both producers.

Three singles were released to promote the album, "Algo Natural", "Enemigos" and "Si no te has ido, vete". "Enemigos" being the most successful. She received a Latin Grammy nomination for Best Female Rock Vocal Performance. It lost to Shakira's "Octavo Día" at the first Latin Grammy Awards.

At the time of release, this album was considered a flop, but eventually led to a Gold Certification in Mexico.

Track listing
"Enemigos" (Sandra Baylac) — 4:11
"Grita" (Pachi López, Reyli Barba) — 3:21
"Si No Te Has Ido, Vete" (Reyli Barba) — 3:05
"Algo Natural" (Jorge Villamizar) — 3:57
"Volaré" (Alejandra Guzmán, Didi Gutman) — 3:31
"Vuelvo a Besar" (feat. Johnny "Papi-Chulo" Wiggins) (V. Gandini) — 3:43
"Bye, Bye Love" (Freddy Committee, Jorge Montesano) — 3:25
"Paloma Herida" (Juan Carlos Calderón) — 4:15
"Me Perdí en Tu Cuerpo" (Juan Carlos Calderón) — 4:44
"Mátame" (Juan Carlos Calderón) — 3:44
"Qué Más Da" (Juan Carlos Calderón) — 2:59
"Había Olvidado" (Juan Carlos Calderón) — 3:06
"Haz la Guerra y el Amor" (Juan Carlos Calderón) — 2:54
"Por Qué Tengo Que Amarte" (Juan Carlos Calderón) — 3:14

Singles

Personnel
Tracks 1 to 7
Producer: Oscar López
Arranger: Didi Gutman, Oscar López, Amaury López, Sebastián Krys, Joel Someillian
Background vocals arranger: Skyler Jet
Metal arranger: Amaury López
Recorded at: The Warehouse Recording Studios (Miami, Florida) by John Thomas
Mixer: David Dachinger, Sebastián Krys, Oscar López

Track 8
Producers: Oscar López and Juan Carlos Calderón

Tracks 9 to 14
Producer, arranger and piano player: Juan Carlos Calderón
Arranger: Jacobo Calderón, Amaury López
Background vocals: Carlos Murguía, Francis Benitez
Recorded at: Sunset Studio, Sunset Sound Factory and Capitol
Mixer: John Thomas and Carlos Santos
Photographer: Ursula Puga and Gonzalo Morales
Design: Javier Romero for Design Group

Musicians
Tracks 1 to 8
Piano: Didi Gutman
Guitar: David Cabrera
Bass: John Falcone
drums: Eloy Polito Sanchez 
Violin: Pedro Alfonso

Tracks 9 to 14
Drums: Eloy polito Sanchez 
Bass: Lee Sklar
Electric guitar: Tim Pierce, George Doering.
keyboards: Pablo Aguirre
Accordion: Frank Marocco

Sales and certifications

References

1999 albums
Alejandra Guzmán albums
Albums produced by Juan Carlos Calderón